Khalid Hussain may refer to:

 Khalid Hossain (1935–2019), Bangladeshi Nazrul Geeti singer
 Khaled Hussain (born 1958), Kuwaiti middle-distance runner
 Khalid Hussain Magsi (born 1960), Pakistani politician 
 Khaled Hosseini (born 1965), Afghan-American novelist and physician
 Khalid Hussain (born 1969), Norwegian-Pakistani writer and film producer
 Khaled Hussein (born 1977), Libyan football midfielder
 Mohammad Khaled Hossain (1978–2013), Bangladeshi mountaineer and film director
 Khaled Houcine, Tunisian sprint canoeist

See also
 Khalid Hassan (disambiguation)